Peter Grant may refer to:

Sportspeople
 Peter Grant (athlete) (born 1954), Australian Olympic sprinter
 Peter Grant (footballer, born 1879) (1879–1937), Scottish footballer  
 Peter Grant (footballer, born 1965), Scottish football player and coach, played for Celtic and Scotland, manager of Norwich City
 Peter Grant (footballer, born 1994), Scottish football player, played for Falkirk, son of footballer born 1965
 Peter Grant (rugby union) (born 1984), South African rugby union player

Other people
 Peter Grant (1714-1824), Last Survivor of the Jacobite rising of 1745.
 Peter Grant (abbé) (died 1784), Scottish Roman Catholic priest, agent and abbé
 Peter Grant (politician) (born 1960), SNP politician elected 2015
 Peter Grant (journalist), journalist for The Wall Street Journal
 Peter Grant (music manager) (1935–1995), English music manager
 Peter Grant (pastor) (1783–1867), Scottish pastor, poet and songwriter known as Pàdraig Grannd nan Oran
 Peter Grant (singer) (born 1987), English singer
 Peter and Rosemary Grant, evolutionary biologists at Princeton University
 Peter Grant (VC) (1824–1868), Irish Victoria Cross recipient
 Peter J. Grant (1943–1990), British ornithologist
 Peter Mitchell Grant (born 1944), Scottish academic
 Peter Grant (sculptor) (1915–2003), Irish sculptor
Peter Grant, Canadian businessman and complainant in Grant v Torstar Corp, a leading Supreme Court of Canada case on defamation

Other uses
 Peter Grant (book series), a series of fantasy novels by Ben Aaronovitch